Stephen Allan "Steve" Capus (born October 4, 1963) is an Executive Editor of CBS News.
He is the former president of NBC News.

Early life and career
Steve Capus was born in 1963, the son of Jean and Paul Capus. His mother is a teacher's aide; his father is a district manager for a dental supply company. He graduated from William Tennent High School in Warminster, Pennsylvania, and went on to attend Temple University, graduating with a Bachelor of Arts in journalism in 1986. Capus began his journalism career in radio and print, working at several stations and daily newspapers in the Philadelphia area. Capus was a director at WCSD-FM, a nonprofit community radio station in Warminster, in the early 1980s.  He worked at WCAU-TV in Philadelphia in 1986, and became an executive producer with KYW-TV in Philadelphia in 1990.
 
Capus moved to Charlotte, N.C. in 1993, joining the NBC News team as the senior producer of NBC Nightside, an overnight news program.

Capus then continued his career with NBC in Manhattan. During this time, he was the broadcast producer of "NBC News Sunrise" and then the supervising producer for Today. From 1997 to May 2001, Capus was the executive producer of MSNBC's The News with Brian Williams. He was also the executive producer of numerous NBC News breaking reports and MSNBC special broadcasts. Among them were the 2000 presidential primaries and election, the “Summit in Silicon Valley” with Tom Brokaw and the political series 100 Days, 1000 Voices.

Capus was the executive producer of NBC Nightly News from May 2001 to June 2005. During this time, Capus was the executive producer for NBC News' coverage of the terror attacks on September 11, 2001, the war in Iraq, and the "Decision 2002-2004" political coverage.

Capus was then promoted to senior vice president of NBC News, where he led the network news division, was executive in charge of MSNBC, MSNBC and NBCNEWS.com digital and mobile properties, and NBC News radio.

Capus served as a member of the following boards: NBC/Microsoft Joint Venture, The Weather Channel and weather.com, and The Newseum in Washington, DC.

President of NBC News
In November 2005, Capus was named president of NBC News. Capus has served as the arbiter of issues involving ethics, style, standards, safety and other matters that affected the Division's journalistic bearing. Capus reported to Steve Burke, chief executive officer of NBC Universal.

Capus announced February 1, 2013 that he was leaving the network.

Steve Capus joined IESE Business School as Executive in Residence, to share his expertise. Steve Capus started a blog in January 2014 with stories and analysis about entrepreneurs, leadership, communications, journalism, politics, transformation, innovation, The Digital Revolution and big ideas.

CBS News
On May 6, 2014, CBS News announced that Capus would join the Network as Executive Editor of CBS News and Executive Producer of the CBS Evening News. In his role as Executive Editor of CBS News, Capus' multi-platform expertise, as well as his decades of newsgathering and production experience, provides a key resource to the entire news division. Capus also brings his extensive management and award-winning journalism experience to the CBS Evening News as Executive Producer. He was dismissed of those duties on January 23, 2018, and replaced in that capacity by Mosheh Oinounou.

CBS News Chairman Jeff Fager lauded Capus as a successful journalist and news manager and said that “he is a real pro with an extraordinary record, and we are fortunate to have him joining us at CBS News.”
In the announcement, CBS News President David Rhodes said that “Steve will make the Evening News more competitive than ever and will make our management team stronger than ever.”

Personal life
In 1996, he married former NBC News producer Sophia Faskianos in a Greek Orthodox ceremony in Dover, New Hampshire. He has three children.

Awards

 2004 Gerald Loeb Award for Television Short Form business journalism for "The Jobless Recovery"

References

External links
NBC News announcement of Steve Capus's promotion to president
NBC Executive bio of Steve Capus

CBS News bio of Steve Capus

Temple University alumni
Living people
NBC executives
1963 births
Gerald Loeb Award winners for Television
Presidents of NBC News